Ek Adbhut Dakshina Guru Dakshina is an 2015 Indian film directed by Kiran Phadnis, and produced by Aayush Phadnis and Eshaan Phadnis.

Plot 
Set in Bengal, Guru Dakshina begins as an ode to classical dance forms, with the guru-shisya (teacher-student) relationship at the heart of it. An orphaned boy Dev (Rajeev Govinda Pillai) is adopted by Guruji (Girish Karnad) and brought to his dance academy in Kolkata, owing to his dancing skills. Impressed by his talent, guruji takes him under his wings. However, Dev's one-sided love for Guruji's daughter Sanjukta (Sulagna Panigrahi) changes their lives forever. Sanjukta finds herself seduced by Chhau dancer Gambhira (Rajesh Shringarpure) instead, who seems like a man of dubious intent. Turns out he is a Naxalite, on a secret mission. Dev suspects Gambhira's motives and warns Sanjukta but she doesn't pay heed. Dev is heartbroken and guruji devastated, when Sanjukta secretly marries Gambhira. Post marriage, Gambhira shows his true colours, thus ruining the life of his wife and Guruji. Meanwhile, an accident takes Dev to Himachal.

Cast 
 Girish Karnad as Guruji
 Roopa Ganguly
 Rupsha Guha
 Rajeev Govinda Pillai as Dev
 Sulagna Panigrahi as Sanjukta, daughter of Guruji
 Rajesh Shringarpure as Gambhira

Soundtrack 
The soundtrack for the album is composed by Som, Siddharth Chopra, Ismail Darbar and lyrics are penned by Nida Fazli, Chi Chi Paswan.

References

External links 

2010s Hindi-language films